Herve Bohbot is a French Scrabble player who competes in both French and English language Scrabble competitions. He is also an administrator on the online Scrabble site Internet Scrabble Club, the president of the French matchplay Scrabble committee and an official on the French-speaking International Scrabble Federation.

Biography
In French, Bohbot is ranked in première série - the top 1% of French Scrabble players. Bohbot finished second in the 2004 French matchplay championship, first in 2005, 2006 and 2011.

In English, he has represented France on six occasions at the World Scrabble Championship from 2003 to 2013. The highlight of these championships was almost certainly his victory against former World Champion Joel Wapnick in 2005.

Notable Achievements

French matchplay championship
 winner (2005)
 second place (2004, 2006, 2007, 2011)

World Scrabble Championship 
 2003 87th/89 (8 wins, 16 losses)
 2005 93rd/102 (9 wins, 15 losses)
 2007 94th/104 (9 wins, 15 losses)
 2009 85th/108 (10 wins, 14 losses)
 2011 100th/106 (11 wins, 23 losses)
 2013 99th/110 (14 wins, 17 losses)

See also
Internet Scrabble Club
Francophone Scrabble
World Scrabble Championship

External links

French-speaking World scrabble Championship, Montpellier 2010

References

French Scrabble players
Living people
Place of birth missing (living people)
Year of birth missing (living people)